Light station may refer to:

Lighthouse
Lightvessel